Trentepohlia is a genus of crane fly in the family Limoniidae.

Species
Subgenus Anchimongoma Brunetti, 1918
T. angusticincta Alexander, 1947
T. apoicola Alexander, 1931
T. beata Alexander, 1932
T. niveipes Edwards, 1927
T. simplex (Brunetti, 1918)
Subgenus Mongoma Westwood, 1881
T. acanthophora Alexander, 1973
T. aequialba Alexander, 1931
T. aequinigra Alexander, 1931
T. albangusta Edwards, 1928
T. albilata Alexander, 1920
T. albilatissima Alexander, 1920
T. albipennis (de Meijere, 1913)
T. alboposticata Alexander, 1960
T. alboterminalis Alexander, 1932
T. amissa Alexander, 1964
T. amphileuca Alexander, 1936
T. amphinipha Alexander, 1967
T. argopoda Alexander, 1960
T. atayal Alexander, 1929
T. atrobasalis Alexander, 1959
T. auranticolor Alexander, 1934
T. auricosta Alexander, 1934
T. australasiae Skuse, 1890
T. bicinctatra Alexander, 1953
T. bombayensis Edwards, 1927
T. brassi Alexander, 1960
T. brevicellula Alexander, 1924
T. brevifusa Alexander, 1930
T. brevipes Alexander, 1931
T. brunnea Edwards, 1928
T. butleri Alexander, 1950
T. cachani Alexander, 1953
T. callisto Alexander, 1955
T. cameronensis Edwards, 1928
T. carbonipes Alexander, 1934
T. cariniceps (Enderlein, 1912)
T. choprai Alexander, 1927
T. costofimbriata Alexander, 1935
T. distalis Alexander, 1931
T. distigma Edwards, 1928
T. dummeri Alexander, 1921
T. duyagi Alexander, 1930
T. dybasiana Alexander, 1972
T. elegantissima Alexander, 1961
T. enervata Alexander, 1936
T. ephippiata Alexander, 1936
T. errans Alexander, 1944
T. esakii Alexander, 1923
T. eurystigma Alexander, 1973
T. filicornis Edwards, 1928
T. fimbriata Edwards, 1933
T. fimbricosta Alexander, 1973
T. flava (Brunetti, 1918)
T. flavicollis (Edwards, 1925)
T. flavidella Alexander, 1978
T. flavoides Alexander, 1973
T. fortis Edwards, 1926
T. fragillima (Westwood, 1881)
T. fulvinota Alexander, 1932
T. fuscistigma Edwards, 1928
T. fuscogenualis Alexander, 1969
T. galactopa Edwards, 1927
T. guamensis (Alexander, 1915)
T. hainanica Alexander, 1936
T. hendersoni Edwards, 1928
T. hepatica Alexander, 1960
T. horiana Alexander, 1960
T. ibelensis Alexander, 1964
T. kempi (Brunetti, 1918)
T. kinabaluensis Edwards, 1933
T. labuana Edwards, 1931
T. laetithorax Alexander, 1934
T. latatra Alexander, 1953
T. liponeura Alexander, 1962
T. longisetosa Alexander, 1936
T. lutescens Edwards, 1931
T. luzonensis Edwards, 1926
T. macrotrichia Alexander, 1964
T. madagascariensis Alexander, 1920
T. majestica Alexander, 1960
T. majuscula Alexander, 1931
T. metatarsatra Alexander, 1920
T. monacantha Alexander, 1978
T. montina Alexander, 1930
T. nigrescens Alexander, 1936
T. nigriceps (de Meijere, 1919)
T. niveipes Alexander, 1921
T. obscura (de Meijere, 1913)
T. pacifica Alexander, 1921
T. pallidipes Edwards, 1928
T. pallidiventris (Brunetti, 1912)
T. parallela Alexander, 1951
T. parvella Alexander, 1973
T. parvicellula Alexander, 1973
T. parvicellula Edwards, 1928
T. parvistigma Alexander, 1973
T. patens Alexander, 1967
T. pendleburyi Edwards, 1928
T. pennipes (Osten Sacken, 1888)
T. pererecta Alexander, 1973
T. persimilis Alexander, 1932
T. platyleuca Alexander, 1936
T. poliocephala Alexander, 1929
T. praesulis Alexander, 1947
T. principalis Alexander, 1957
T. pumila Alexander, 1973
T. quadrimaculata Edwards, 1931
T. regifica Alexander, 1953
T. reisi Alexander, 1920
T. retracta Edwards, 1927
T. ricardi Alexander, 1930
T. riverai Alexander, 1930
T. saipanensis Alexander, 1972
T. samoensis Alexander, 1921
T. sarawakensis Edwards, 1926
T. saxatilis Alexander, 1929
T. scalator Alexander, 1953
T. separata Alexander, 1934
T. setifera Edwards, 1931
T. siporensis Edwards, 1932
T. solomonensis Alexander, 1936
T. spectralis Edwards, 1928
T. spiculata Edwards, 1933
T. spinaspersa Alexander, 1964
T. spinulifera Edwards, 1928
T. splendida (Brunetti, 1918)
T. subappressa Alexander, 1964
T. subpennata Alexander, 1935
T. subpennipes Alexander, 1957
T. subquadrata Edwards, 1926
T. subtenera Alexander, 1936
T. tarsalba Alexander, 1929
T. tarsalis Alexander, 1924
T. tenera (Osten Sacken, 1882)
T. teneroides Alexander, 1932
T. tenuicercus Alexander, 1964
T. tomensis Alexander, 1957
T. valida Edwards, 1928
T. varipes Alexander, 1960
T. vitrina Alexander, 1973
T. walshiana Alexander, 1936
Subgenus Neomongoma Alexander, 1919
T. disjuncta (Alexander, 1913)
T. fuscoterminalis Alexander, 1949
T. mesonotalis Alexander, 1949
T. pictipes Alexander, 1979
T. sordidipennis Alexander, 1943
T. suberecta Alexander, 1939
T. zernyi Alexander, 1942
Subgenus Paramongoma Brunetti, 1911
T. aequivena Alexander, 1980
T. albitarsis (Doleschall, 1857)
T. amatrix Alexander, 1942
T. banahaoensis Alexander, 1930
T. bromeliadicola (Alexander, 1912)
T. bromeliae Alexander, 1969
T. calliope Alexander, 1944
T. chionopoda Alexander, 1931
T. chiriquiana Alexander, 1934
T. concumbens Alexander, 1942
T. conscripta Alexander, 1949
T. cubitalis Alexander, 1931
T. disparilis Alexander, 1944
T. ditzleri Alexander, 1947
T. dominicana Alexander, 1947
T. extensa (Alexander, 1913)
T. faustina Alexander, 1945
T. femorata Alexander, 1921
T. flavella Alexander, 1921
T. fuscipes Alexander, 1921
T. fuscistigmosa Alexander, 1960
T. fuscolimbata Alexander, 1950
T. geniculata (Alexander, 1914)
T. laudabilis Alexander, 1942
T. leucoxena (Alexander, 1914)
T. longifusa (Alexander, 1913)
T. lucrifera Alexander, 1936
T. luteola Alexander, 1956
T. manca (Williston, 1896)
T. mera Alexander, 1926
T. metatarsata (Alexander, 1915)
T. montivaga Alexander, 1949
T. neogama Alexander, 1943
T. nigeriensis Alexander, 1920
T. niveitarsis (Alexander, 1913)
T. pallida (Williston, 1896)
T. pallidistigma Alexander, 1971
T. pallilutea Alexander, 1975
T. pallipes (Alexander, 1914)
T. perpendicularis Alexander, 1956
T. petulans Alexander, 1937
T. pusilla Edwards, 1927
T. ramisiana (Riedel, 1914)
T. roraimicola Alexander, 1935
T. sororcula Alexander, 1919
T. suberrans Alexander, 1979
T. subleucoxena Alexander, 1940
T. suffuscipes Alexander, 1947
T. tatei Alexander, 1960
T. tethys Alexander, 1949
T. tucumana Alexander, 1936
Subgenus Plesiomongoma Brunetti, 1918
T. callinota Alexander, 1938
T. candidipes Edwards, 1928
T. nigropennata Edwards, 1928
T. novaebrittaniae Alexander, 1935
T. subcandidipes Alexander, 1937
T. venosa (Brunetti, 1918)
Subgenus Promongoma Alexander, 1938
T. mirabilis Alexander, 1938
Subgenus Trentepohlia Bigot, 1854
T. abronia Alexander, 1973
T. africana Alexander, 1930
T. albogeniculata (Brunetti, 1912)
T. alluaudi Alexander, 1920
T. amantis Alexander, 1956
T. angustilinea Alexander, 1973
T. arachne Alexander, 1956
T. atrogenualis Alexander, 1970
T. aurantia Alexander, 1920
T. bakeri Alexander, 1927
T. bellipennis Alexander, 1955
T. bifasciata Edwards, 1928
T. bifascigera Alexander, 1940
T. bougainvillensis Alexander, 1973
T. brevisector Alexander, 1923
T. camillerii Alexander, 1960
T. cara Alexander, 1956
T. centrofusca Alexander, 1960
T. centrofuscoides Alexander, 1972
T. christophersi Edwards, 1927
T. clitellaria Alexander, 1934
T. curtipennis (Speiser, 1908)
T. delectabilis Alexander, 1941
T. disconnectans Alexander, 1970
T. doddi Alexander, 1922
T. estella Alexander, 1972
T. exornata Bergroth, 1888
T. fenestrata Alexander, 1956
T. festivipennis Edwards, 1928
T. fijiensis (Alexander, 1914)
T. fuscoapicalis Alexander, 1920
T. fuscobasalis Alexander, 1934
T. fuscomedia Alexander, 1973
T. gracilis Enderlein, 1912
T. hexaphalerata Alexander, 1965
T. holoxantha Alexander, 1929
T. humeralis Alexander, 1921
T. hyalina Alexander, 1921
T. infernalis Alexander, 1967
T. inflata Alexander, 1920
T. isis Alexander, 1956
T. jacobi Alexander, 1934
T. joana Alexander, 1974
T. laetipennis Alexander, 1931
T. larotypa Alexander, 1956
T. lepida Alexander, 1973
T. leucophaea Alexander, 1959
T. limata Alexander, 1973
T. luteicosta Alexander, 1973
T. luteicostata Alexander, 1978
T. marmorata (Brunetti, 1912)
T. mcgregori Alexander, 1927
T. mediofusca Alexander, 1960
T. melanoleuca Alexander, 1958
T. msingiensis Lindner, 1958
T. nigricolor Alexander, 1921
T. nigripes Alexander, 1953
T. nigrita Alexander, 1963
T. nigroapicalis (Brunetti, 1912)
T. nox Alexander, 1921
T. obsoleta Edwards, 1927
T. ornatipennis Brunetti, 1918
T. pallidipleura Alexander, 1926
T. pamela Alexander, 1959
T. percelestis Alexander, 1958
T. perelongata Alexander, 1975
T. perigethes Alexander, 1960
T. perpicturata Alexander, 1950
T. pictipennis Bezzi, 1916
T. pomeroyi Alexander, 1921
T. proba Alexander, 1935
T. pulchripennis Alexander, 1923
T. reversalis Alexander, 1926
T. richteri Alexander, 1978
T. saucia (Alexander, 1915)
T. septemtrionalis Alexander, 1921
T. speiseri Edwards, 1913
T. strepens Alexander, 1936
T. suavis Alexander, 1955
T. sutilis Alexander, 1953
T. taylori Alexander, 1931
T. trentepohlii (Wiedemann, 1828)
T. tripunctata Edwards, 1934
T. ugandae Alexander, 1920
T. umbricellula Alexander, 1975
T. venustipennis Edwards, 1926
T. zambesiae (Alexander, 1912)

References

Catalogue of the Craneflies of the World

Limoniidae